Yo-han is a Korean masculine given name. Its meaning differs based on the hanja used to write each syllable of the name. There are 28 hanja with the reading "yo" and 23 hanja with the reading "han" on the South Korean government's official list of hanja which may be registered for use in given names. Yo-han is also the official Korean equivalent of the Biblical name John. As such, it is sometimes used as a given name by Korean Christians, particularly Korean Catholics.

People with this name include:
Chu Yo-han (1900–1979), South Korean poet
John Cho (born Cho Yo-han, 1972), South Korean-born American actor
Lee Yo-han (born 1985), South Korean football player
Kim Yo-han (volleyball) (born 1985), South Korean volleyball player
Byun Yo-han (born 1986), South Korean actor
Go Yo-han (born 1988), South Korean football right back
Park Yo-han (born 1989), South Korean football full back
Yohan Hwang (born 1995), South Korean singer in the Philippines
Kim Yo-han (singer) (born 1999), South Korean singer and actor, member of boy band WEi

Fictional characters with this name include:
Kim Yo-han, in 2009 South Korean film White Night
Kim Yo-han, in 2011 South Korean television series White Christmas
Cha Yo-han, in 2019 South Korean television series Doctor John

See also
List of Korean given names

References

Korean masculine given names